An international standard is a standard developed by an international standards organization.

International Standard may also refer to 

International Standard (dance), a category of ballroom dance
International Standard Version, an English Bible translation
International reference standard, a measurement standard